Florin Constantinovici (born 12 February 1968) is a Romanian former footballer who played as a defender.

Honours

Player
Rapid București
Divizia B: 1989–90

External links

Voetball International profile 

1968 births
Living people
Footballers from Bucharest
Romanian footballers
Romania international footballers
FC Rapid București players
FC Dinamo București players
FC Brașov (1936) players
FC Politehnica Timișoara players
SC Heerenveen players
Hapoel Tzafririm Holon F.C. players
Eredivisie players
Liga Leumit players
Liga I players
Expatriate footballers in the Netherlands
Romanian expatriate sportspeople in the Netherlands
Expatriate footballers in Israel
Romanian expatriate footballers
Association football defenders